Navin Patel (born 3 September 1994) is a New Zealand cricketer who plays for Central Districts. He made his first-class debut on 17 December 2015 in the 2015–16 Plunket Shield. He made his List A debut for Central Districts on 18 January 2017 in the 2016–17 Ford Trophy.

References

External links
 

1994 births
Living people
New Zealand cricketers
Central Districts cricketers
Cricketers from Birmingham, West Midlands
New Zealand sportspeople of Indian descent
British emigrants to New Zealand